Mount Franklin may refer to:

Antarctica 
Mount Franklin (Antarctica)

Australia 
Mount Franklin (Australian Capital Territory), on the border between the Australian Capital Territory and New South Wales
Mount Franklin (Victoria)

New Zealand 
Mount Franklin (Canterbury)
Mount Franklin (Southland)
Mount Franklin (Tasman)
Mount Franklin (West Coast)

United States 
Mount Franklin (New Hampshire)
North Mount Franklin (Texas)

Other uses
Mount Franklin Water, a brand of mineral water owned by Coca-Cola Amatil

See also
Franklin Mountains State Park, Texas
Mount Frankland National Park, Western Australia